Jade Solid Gold (Chinese: 勁歌金曲, literally "powerful song golden melody") is a music show on the TVB Jade television channel in Hong Kong. It has been running since October 10, 1981.

Broadcasting time

TVB Jade
Sunday at 11:00pm to 11:45pm

TVB HD Jade
Next Saturday at 5pm to 6pm

History
Starting on October 10, 1981, every week, Jade Solid Gold features today's music videos, live performances or concerts, and a countdown of the top 20 best albums sold amongst the competition. The show has a live audience. Most of the performances are cantopop, rock, soul, and light music. Every January the Jade Solid Gold Best Ten Music Awards Presentation (十大勁歌金曲頒獎典禮) is one of the biggest music awards in Hong Kong. Along with the RTHK Top 10 Awards, they are the most recognized and publicized awards given.

The program also has a companion program called "Jade Solid Gold Song Video Corner (金曲挑戰站) ", in which a random music video is featured; hence the name.

Participants
The majority of the singers to appear on the show are Cantopop or Hong Kong-based artists. Some mainland Chinese and Taiwanese artists have also performed on the show.

Comparisons
A number of music themed shows have a similar format with Jade Solid Gold. This includes 360° (formerly 360° Boundless Music, 360° 音樂無邊) and Global Rhythm (無間音樂).

Presenters

Current presenters
 Carrie Tam
 Ally Tse
 Auston Lam
 Daniel Chau
 Alvin Ng
 Jessica Law

Former presenters
{
|
 at17
 Cindy Au
 Nadia Chan
 Lawrence Cheng
 Nicola Cheung
 Bondy Chiu
 Amigo Choi
 Kent Choi
 Tracy Chu
 Paul Chung
 Vivian Chow
 Cerina Filomena da Graça
 G.E.M.
 Denise Ho
 Elaine Ho
 MC Jin
|
 Leo Ku
 Andrew Lam
 Jerry Lamb
 Hacken Lee
 Joey Leung
 Sammy Leung
 Mimi Lo
 Joe Nieh
 Patrick Tang
 Amigo Tsui
 Wyman Wong
 Woo Fung
 Paisley Wu
 Anna Yau
 Anita Yuen
 Louis Yuen
 Stephanie Ho
 Jinny Ng
 Fred Cheng
 Alfred Hui
 Hubert Wu
 Ronald Law
 Hoffman Tse
|}

See also
Jade Solid Gold Best Ten Music Awards Presentation
List of television programmes broadcast by TVB

External links
 TVB.com Jade Solid Gold - Official Website 
 TVB.com Jade Solid Gold - 2nd Official Website 

TVB original programming
Cantopop